Brenda Mwika Tambatamba is a Zambian politician.

Tambatamba is a member of the National Assembly of Zambia for Kasempa. She is a member of the United Party for National Development.

References

1961 births
Living people
Zambian politicians
United Party for National Development politicians
21st-century Zambian women politicians
21st-century Zambian politicians